Faridabad Division is one of the six divisions of Haryana state of India. It comprises the districts of Faridabad, Palwal and Nuh. It was announced in January 2017 and approved by the Haryana cabinet on 2 February 2017.

See also
 Districts of Haryana
 Divisions of Haryana
 Karnal division

References

External links
 Faridabad police range
 Faridabad website

Divisions of Haryana